Nancy K. Pearson (born 1969) is an American poet. She is the author of The Whole by Contemplation of a Single Bone (Fordham University Press, 2016) and Two Minutes of Light (Perugia Press, 2008).

Her poems have been published in many literary journals and magazines including Five Points, Oxford American Magazine, Alaska Quarterly, Gulf Coast, The Iowa Review, Black Warrior Review, Indiana Review, Provincetown Arts Magazine, and others.

Her honors include winning the 2015 Poets Out Loud Prize, The 2015 Inprint Donald Barthelme Prize in Poetry and The 2014 Inprint Marion Barthelme Prize in Nonfiction, the Perugia Press Prize, the 2009 L. L. Winship/PEN New England Award, The Massachusetts Book Awards "Must Read Book of 2009" and two seven-month fellowships at the Fine Arts Work Center in Provincetown.

Life
Pearson was born in 1969, grew up in Chattanooga, Tennessee. She received her B.A. from University of Virginia, her M.F.A. in Poetry from George Mason University, and Nonfiction from the University of Houston, where she taught literature and writing. She is currently an Assistant Professor (English) at West Chester University, PA, has been a faculty member at 24 Pearl Street and has taught at The Fine Arts Work Center's Summer Program.

Bibliography
 The Whole by Contemplation of a Single Bone. (Fordham University Press, 2016) , 
 Two Minutes of Light. (Perugia Press, 2008) , 

In Anthology
 Show Us Your Papers (Main Street Rag, October 2020)
 Miracle Monocle: Queer, Rural and American (University of Louisville, November 2019)
 Method and Mystery. Ed. Tresha Faye Haefner (Poetry Salon Press, March 2019).
 Ghost Fishing: An Eco-Justice Poetry Anthology by Melissa Tuckey. (University of Georgia Press, 2018)
 Ordinary Genius: A Guide to the Poet Within by Kim Addonizio. (Norton, 2009)

Honors and awards
2015 Poets Out Loud Prize, Fordham 
2015 Donald Barthelme Prize, Poetry
2014 Marion Barthelme Prize, Creative Writing 
2012 Pushcart Prize Nomination
2010 Wabash Poetry Prize, Sycamore Review
2010 Sonora Review Poetry Prize
2010 Spoon River Poetry Review, Editor's Prize
2010 Tusculum Review Poetry Prize
2010 Anderbo Poetry Award
2010 Massachusetts Cultural Council, Finalist Grantee
2009 L.L. Winship/PEN New England Award for Two Minutes of Light
9th Annual Massachusetts Book Awards, "Must Read Book" 2009 for Two Minutes of Light
2009 Lambda Literary Awards finalist
2008 Perugia Press Prize for a First or Second Book of Poems and publication of Two Minutes of Light
2008 Dorothy Sargent Memorial Award
2008 Astraea Writers Fund, Honorable Mention Grantee
2008 Key West Literary Seminar, Scotti Merrill Scholarship
2008 Pushcart Prize Nominee
2008 Cultural Center of Cape Cod Poetry Prize
2007-2008 Fine Arts Work Center, Second Year Seven-Month Fellowship, Provincetown
2006-2007 Fine Arts Work Center, Seven-Month Fellowship, Provincetown, MA
2007 Iowa Review Poetry Award, second place
2006 Whiskey Island Review Poetry Prize

References

External links
 http://news.fordham.edu/arts-and-culture/apocalypse-and-eco-poetics-winners-named-for-2014-15-poets-out-loud-book-prize-series/
 Fordham University Press
 Perugia Press > Author Page > Nancy K. Pearson
 Interview: The Provincetown Banner and The Advocate > Arts > April 17, 2008 > Pearson's Poems Pen a Cautionary Tale by Sue Harrison
 http://www.sycamorereview.com/contest/
 Interview & Poems: How a Poem Happens: Contemporary Poets Discuss the Making of Poems > June 5, 2009 > Interview with Nancy K. Pearson by Brian Brodeur
 Spoon River Poetry Review 2010 Editors' Prize
 Review: Balanced on the Edge > October 29, 2008 > Review by Christine Swint of Two Minutes of Light by Nancy K. Pearson
 http://www.hungermtn.org/poetry/

1969 births
Living people
American women poets
George Mason University alumni
University of Virginia alumni
Poets from Massachusetts
Poets from Tennessee
20th-century American poets
20th-century American women writers
21st-century American poets
21st-century American women writers
People from Chattanooga, Tennessee